Jiban Ghosh can refer to:

 Jiban Ghosh (cricketer) (born 1946), an Indian cricketer
 Jiban Ghosh (umpire) (1935–2004), an Indian cricket umpire